Walter Schlagbauer (born 21 June 1960) is an Austrian former sailor. He competed in the Tornado event at the 1984 Summer Olympics.

References

External links
 

1960 births
Living people
Austrian male sailors (sport)
Olympic sailors of Austria
Sailors at the 1984 Summer Olympics – Tornado
People from Feldkirchen District
Sportspeople from Carinthia (state)